String Quartet No. 4 may refer to:

 String Quartet No. 4 (Babbitt) by Milton Babbitt
 String Quartet No. 4 (Bartók) by Béla Bartók
 String Quartet No. 4 (Beethoven) by Ludwig van Beethoven
 String Quartet No. 4 (Bois), The Independent by Rob du Bois
 String Quartet No. 4 (Bridge) by Frank Bridge
 String Quartet No. 4 (Carter) by Elliott Carter
 String Quartet No. 4 (Diamond) by David Diamond
 String Quartet No. 4 (Dvořák) by Antonín Dvořák
 String Quartet No. 4 (Ferneyhough) by Brian Ferneyhough
 String Quartet No. 4 (Glass) by Philip Glass
 String Quartet No. 4 (Halffter) by Cristóbal Halffter
 String Quartet No. 4 (Hill) by Alfred Hill
 String Quartet No. 4 (Hiller), Illiac Suite by Lejaren Hiller
 String Quartet No. 4 (Hindemith), Op. 22, by Paul Hindemith
 String Quartet No. 4 (Kirchner) by Leon Kirchner
 String Quartet No. 4 (McCabe) by John McCabe
 String Quartet No. 4 (Maconchy) by Elizabeth Maconchy
 String Quartet No. 4 (Marco), Los desastres de la guerra by Tomás Marco
 String Quartet No. 4 (Mendelssohn) by Felix Mendelssohn
 String Quartet No. 4 (Milhaud), Op. 46, by Darius Milhaud
 String Quartet No. 4 (Mozart) by Wolfgang Amadeus Mozart
 String Quartet No. 4 (Nielsen) by Carl Nielsen
 String Quartet No. 4 (Oswald) by Henrique Oswald
 String Quartet No. 4 (Persichetti) Parable X, Op. 122, by Vincent Persichetti
 String Quartet No. 4 (Piston) by Walter Piston
 String Quartet No. 4 (Porter) by Quincy Porter
 String Quartet No. 4 (Revueltas), Música de feria by Silvestre Revueltas
 String Quartet No. 4 (Rihm) by Wolfgang Rihm
 String Quartet No. 4 (Schoenberg) by Arnold Schoenberg
 String Quartet No. 4 (Schubert) by Franz Schubert
 String Quartet No. 4 (Shostakovich) by Dmitri Shostakovich
 String Quartet No. 4 (Tippett) by Michael Tippett
 String Quartet No. 4 (Villa-Lobos) by Heitor Villa-Lobos